The Braille pattern dots-1256 is a 6-dot braille cell with the top left, both middle, and bottom right dots raised, or an 8-dot braille cell with the top left, both upper-middle, and lower-middle right dots raised. It is represented by the Unicode code point U+2833, and in Braille ASCII with a backslash: \.

Unified Braille

In unified international braille, the braille pattern dots-1256 is used to represent a close back vowel, such as /u/ or /ɯ/ when multiple letters correspond to these values, and is otherwise assigned as needed.

Table of unified braille values

Other braille

Plus dots 7 and 8

Related to Braille pattern dots-1256 are Braille patterns 12567, 12568, and 125678, which are used in 8-dot braille systems, such as Gardner-Salinas and Luxembourgish Braille.

Related 8-dot kantenji patterns

In the Japanese kantenji braille, the standard 8-dot Braille patterns 2368, 12368, 23468, and 123468 are the patterns related to Braille pattern dots-1256, since the two additional dots of kantenji patterns 01256, 12567, and 012567 are placed above the base 6-dot cell, instead of below, as in standard 8-dot braille.

Kantenji using braille patterns 2368, 12368, 23468, or 123468

This listing includes kantenji using Braille pattern dots-1256 for all 6349 kanji found in JIS C 6226-1978.

  - 巿

Variants and thematic compounds

  -  selector 5 + し/巿  = 申
  -  selector 6 + し/巿  =  曳
  -  selector 6 + selector 6 + し/巿  =  曵
  -  し/巿 + selector 1  =  色
  -  し/巿 + selector 3  =  巾
  -  し/巿 + selector 3 + selector 3  =  黹
  -  数 + し/巿  =  寸
  -  し/巿 + く/艹  =  黒
  -  し/巿 + か/金  =  赤
  -  し/巿 + こ/子  =  黄
  -  し/巿 + せ/食  =  青
  -  し/巿 + み/耳  =  緑
  -  し/巿 + む/車  =  紫

Compounds of 巿

  -  ふ/女 + し/巿  =  姉
  -  ほ/方 + し/巿  =  旆
  -  心 + し/巿  =  柿
  -  ⺼ + し/巿  =  肺
  -  し/巿 + ら/月  =  師
  -  ち/竹 + し/巿 + ら/月  =  篩
  -  せ/食 + し/巿 + ら/月  =  鰤
  -  に/氵 + 宿 + し/巿  =  沛
  -  ち/竹 + 宿 + し/巿  =  霈
  -  も/門 + 龸 + し/巿  =  閙
  -  も/門 + う/宀/#3 + し/巿  =  鬧

Compounds of 申

  -  し/巿 + 数  =  暢
  -  仁/亻 + し/巿  =  伸
  -  ね/示 + し/巿  =  神
  -  心 + ね/示 + し/巿  =  榊
  -  せ/食 + ね/示 + し/巿  =  鰰
  -  い/糹/#2 + し/巿  =  紳
  -  し/巿 + れ/口  =  呻
  -  つ/土 + selector 5 + し/巿  =  坤
  -  て/扌 + selector 5 + し/巿  =  抻

Compounds of 曳

  -  に/氵 + し/巿  =  洩
  -  い/糹/#2 + selector 6 + し/巿  =  絏

Compounds of 色

  -  ゐ/幺 + し/巿  =  絶
  -  た/⽥ + し/巿  =  艶
  -  た/⽥ + た/⽥ + し/巿  =  艷

Compounds of 巾

  -  む/車 + し/巿  =  凧
  -  な/亻 + む/車 + し/巿  =  佩
  -  へ/⺩ + む/車 + し/巿  =  珮
  -  ろ/十 + し/巿  =  布
  -  る/忄 + し/巿  =  怖
  -  め/目 + し/巿  =  希
  -  れ/口 + め/目 + し/巿  =  唏
  -  日 + め/目 + し/巿  =  晞
  -  ん/止 + め/目 + し/巿  =  欷
  -  の/禾 + め/目 + し/巿  =  稀
  -  せ/食 + め/目 + し/巿  =  鯑
  -  ま/石 + し/巿  =  帝
  -  囗 + ま/石 + し/巿  =  啻
  -  れ/口 + ま/石 + し/巿  =  啼
  -  心 + ま/石 + し/巿  =  楴
  -  く/艹 + ま/石 + し/巿  =  蒂
  -  し/巿 + 囗  =  吊
  -  龸 + し/巿  =  常
  -  ふ/女 + 龸 + し/巿  =  嫦
  -  む/車 + 龸 + し/巿  =  蟐
  -  く/艹 + し/巿  =  幕
  -  宿 + く/艹 + し/巿  =  冪
  -  す/発 + く/艹 + し/巿  =  羃
  -  氷/氵 + し/巿  =  幣
  -  氷/氵 + 氷/氵 + し/巿  =  幤
  -  し/巿 + ぬ/力  =  刷
  -  し/巿 + 龸  =  帆
  -  し/巿 + ⺼  =  帥
  -  し/巿 + よ/广  =  帯
  -  し/巿 + し/巿 + よ/广  =  帶
  -  く/艹 + し/巿 + よ/广  =  蔕
  -  し/巿 + と/戸  =  帳
  -  し/巿 + い/糹/#2  =  帷
  -  し/巿 + め/目  =  帽
  -  し/巿 + ふ/女  =  幅
  -  し/巿 + り/分  =  幌
  -  し/巿 + ま/石  =  幔
  -  し/巿 + 日  =  幟
  -  も/門 + 宿 + し/巿  =  匝
  -  し/巿 + selector 1 + ん/止  =  帋
  -  し/巿 + ふ/女 + ゑ/訁  =  帑
  -  し/巿 + 宿 + と/戸  =  帖
  -  し/巿 + selector 6 + け/犬  =  帙
  -  し/巿 + 日 + selector 1  =  帛
  -  し/巿 + を/貝 + と/戸  =  幀
  -  し/巿 + 宿 + い/糹/#2  =  幃
  -  し/巿 + と/戸 + ゆ/彳  =  幄
  -  し/巿 + 龸 + 日  =  幎
  -  し/巿 + 囗 + へ/⺩  =  幗
  -  し/巿 + の/禾 + た/⽥  =  幡
  -  し/巿 + ま/石 + り/分  =  幢
  -  し/巿 + ろ/十 + ゑ/訁  =  黻
  -  し/巿 + 宿 + ほ/方  =  黼

Compounds of 寸

  -  な/亻 + し/巿  =  付
  -  れ/口 + な/亻 + し/巿  =  咐
  -  つ/土 + な/亻 + し/巿  =  坿
  -  て/扌 + な/亻 + し/巿  =  拊
  -  き/木 + な/亻 + し/巿  =  柎
  -  く/艹 + な/亻 + し/巿  =  苻
  -  せ/食 + な/亻 + し/巿  =  鮒
  -  よ/广 + し/巿  =  府
  -  き/木 + よ/广 + し/巿  =  椨
  -  ら/月 + し/巿  =  腑
  -  さ/阝 + し/巿  =  附
  -  宿 + し/巿  =  冠
  -  く/艹 + 宿 + し/巿  =  蒄
  -  囗 + し/巿  =  噂
  -  う/宀/#3 + し/巿  =  守
  -  け/犬 + し/巿  =  狩
  -  つ/土 + し/巿  =  寺
  -  や/疒 + つ/土 + し/巿  =  峙
  -  る/忄 + つ/土 + し/巿  =  恃
  -  た/⽥ + つ/土 + し/巿  =  畤
  -  ゆ/彳 + し/巿  =  待
  -  て/扌 + し/巿  =  持
  -  日 + し/巿  =  時
  -  つ/土 + 日 + し/巿  =  塒
  -  く/艹 + 日 + し/巿  =  蒔
  -  そ/馬 + し/巿  =  特
  -  や/疒 + し/巿  =  痔
  -  ち/竹 + し/巿  =  等
  -  ゑ/訁 + し/巿  =  詩
  -  し/巿 + な/亻  =  侍
  -  へ/⺩ + し/巿  =  寿
  -  へ/⺩ + へ/⺩ + し/巿  =  壽
  -  な/亻 + へ/⺩ + し/巿  =  儔
  -  て/扌 + へ/⺩ + し/巿  =  擣
  -  氷/氵 + へ/⺩ + し/巿  =  濤
  -  た/⽥ + へ/⺩ + し/巿  =  疇
  -  ち/竹 + へ/⺩ + し/巿  =  籌
  -  み/耳 + へ/⺩ + し/巿  =  躊
  -  き/木 + へ/⺩ + し/巿  =  梼
  -  に/氵 + へ/⺩ + し/巿  =  涛
  -  さ/阝 + へ/⺩ + し/巿  =  陦
  -  か/金 + し/巿  =  鋳
  -  か/金 + か/金 + し/巿  =  鑄
  -  み/耳 + し/巿  =  射
  -  そ/馬 + み/耳 + し/巿  =  麝
  -  せ/食 + し/巿  =  尊
  -  つ/土 + せ/食 + し/巿  =  墫
  -  み/耳 + せ/食 + し/巿  =  蹲
  -  せ/食 + せ/食 + し/巿  =  鱒
  -  れ/口 + し/巿  =  尋
  -  に/氵 + れ/口 + し/巿  =  潯
  -  心 + れ/口 + し/巿  =  蕁
  -  ひ/辶 + し/巿  =  導
  -  き/木 + し/巿  =  村
  -  す/発 + し/巿  =  欝
  -  す/発 + す/発 + し/巿  =  鬱
  -  の/禾 + し/巿  =  耐
  -  え/訁 + し/巿  =  討
  -  す/発 + え/訁 + し/巿  =  罸
  -  も/門 + し/巿  =  闘
  -  も/門 + も/門 + し/巿  =  鬪
  -  し/巿 + ろ/十  =  辱
  -  に/氵 + し/巿 + ろ/十  =  溽
  -  い/糹/#2 + し/巿 + ろ/十  =  縟
  -  こ/子 + し/巿 + ろ/十  =  耨
  -  く/艹 + し/巿 + ろ/十  =  蓐
  -  ね/示 + し/巿 + ろ/十  =  褥
  -  れ/口 + 比 + し/巿  =  吋
  -  ろ/十 + 比 + し/巿  =  尅
  -  し/巿 + つ/土 + つ/土  =  幇
  -  る/忄 + 比 + し/巿  =  忖
  -  い/糹/#2 + 比 + し/巿  =  紂
  -  せ/食 + 比 + し/巿  =  酎

Compounds of 黒

  -  し/巿 + つ/土  =  墨
  -  し/巿 + け/犬  =  黙
  -  し/巿 + し/巿 + け/犬  =  默
  -  よ/广 + し/巿 + く/艹  =  廛
  -  ゆ/彳 + し/巿 + く/艹  =  黴
  -  ⺼ + し/巿 + く/艹  =  黶
  -  し/巿 + り/分 + selector 1  =  黔
  -  し/巿 + 仁/亻 + 囗  =  黛
  -  し/巿 + 比 + へ/⺩  =  黜
  -  し/巿 + ゐ/幺 + selector 1  =  黝
  -  し/巿 + つ/土 + れ/口  =  黠
  -  し/巿 + 龸 + れ/口  =  黥
  -  し/巿 + ま/石 + 日  =  黯
  -  し/巿 + つ/土 + を/貝  =  黷

Compounds of 赤

  -  お/頁 + し/巿 + か/金  =  赧

Compounds of 黄

  -  ち/竹 + し/巿 + こ/子  =  簧
  -  龸 + し/巿 + こ/子  =  黌

Compounds of 青

  -  な/亻 + し/巿 + せ/食  =  倩
  -  け/犬 + し/巿 + せ/食  =  猜
  -  め/目 + し/巿 + せ/食  =  睛
  -  心 + し/巿 + せ/食  =  菁
  -  む/車 + し/巿 + せ/食  =  蜻
  -  せ/食 + し/巿 + せ/食  =  鯖

Other compounds

  -  と/戸 + し/巿  =  屍

Notes

Braille patterns